David Emmert Brumbaugh (October 8, 1894 – April 22, 1977) was an American politician. He was a Republican member of the U.S. House of Representatives from Pennsylvania.

D. Emmert Brumbaugh was born in Martinsburg, Pennsylvania. He was a student of the International Correspondence Schools of Scranton, Pennsylvania, and in 1914 he became interested in banking at Claysburg, Pennsylvania. During the First World War he served as a private in the Thirty-third Division, Fifty-eighth Brigade Headquarters, serving overseas in 1918 and 1919, where he served with his cousin, Dr. David Brumbaugh, who later died in a freak barnstorming accident. In 1921 he became interested in the lumber business and later established an insurance agency. He was a trustee of the Pennsylvania Industrial School in Huntingdon, Pennsylvania, from 1939 to 1943.

Brumbaugh was elected as a Republican to the Seventy-eighth Congress to fill the vacancy caused by the resignation of James E. Van Zandt. He was reelected to the Seventy-ninth Congress. He was not a candidate for renomination in 1946. He served as Secretary of Banking of the Commonwealth of Pennsylvania in Harrisburg, Pennsylvania, from 1947 to 1951. He resumed his banking interests as president of the First National Bank of Claysburg. He was a delegate to 1956 Republican National Convention from Pennsylvania. He served in Pennsylvania State Senate from 1963 to 1967.

References
 Retrieved on 2008-01-24
D. Emmert Brumbaugh at The Political Graveyard

Republican Party Pennsylvania state senators
American bankers
American military personnel of World War I
American Congregationalists
1894 births
1977 deaths
People from Blair County, Pennsylvania
Military personnel from Pennsylvania
Businesspeople from Pennsylvania
Republican Party members of the United States House of Representatives from Pennsylvania
20th-century American politicians
20th-century American businesspeople